Vijayaraga (fl. c. 849—895 AD) was the Chera Perumal ruler of Kerala from c. 883/84—c. 895 AD. The reign of Vijayaraga probably witnessed the expansion of Chera Perumal influence into the neighboring Ay and Mushika countries (southern and northern Kerala).

Vijayaraga appears as the royal prince as early as the fifth regnal year of Chera Perumal king Sthanu Ravi Kulasekhara (c. 849 AD). He also married the daughter of Kulasekhara (the Kizhan Adikal Ravi Neel). A record of the princess can be found in the southern Ay country. It is possible that he was also the nephew (son of sister) of Kulasekhara. Two of his daughters were married to the Chola king Parantaka I. 

Vijayaraga was formerly identified with king Goda Ravi (r. 905/06—c. 943/44) of the Chera Perumal dynasty.

Sources

Inscriptions 
 Quilon Syrian copper plates (849 AD) — mentioned as the royal prince under king Sthanu Ravi (r. 844/45—c. 870/71 AD).
 Thirunandikkara inscription — inscription of a Chera Perumal princess (the Kizhan Adikal Ravi Neeli), wife of Vijayaraga and daughter of Kulasekhara.
 Thiruvotriyur inscription (936 AD, 29th regnal year) — inscription of a Chera Perumal princess (the Kizhan Adikal Ravi Neel), wife of Chola king Parantaka I and daughter of Vijayaraga.

Dynastic chronicle 
Vijayaraga must be the same royal who is described as the Kerala king 'Jayaraga' in the Mushika Vamsa Kavya, a dynastic chronicle composed in the 11th century AD. According to the kavya, Jayaraga married the daughter of Kunchi Varma, the Mushika king at the time (North Kollam).

Vijayaraga also led a military expedition to the Mushika kingdom against his brother-in-law Ishana Mushika. It was Goda Varma Keralaketu, a son of Jayaraga, who eventually re-established a truce between the two kingdoms.

References 

People of the Kodungallur Chera kingdom
9th-century Indian monarchs
Kodungallur Chera kings